Annie Neugebauer is a Texas based contemporary author of horror and poetry. Educated at the University of Texas at Austin, Neugebauer has been the webmaster for the Poetry Society of Texas. She has been nominated for the Bram Stoker Award twice. Her work has been published in a wide number of magazines including such names as Apex Magazine and Black Static. Neugebauer has also had her work appear in anthologies like the Year’s Best Hardcore Horror Volumes 3 & 4. She's a member of the Horror Writers Association.

Bibliography

Anthologies

Short fiction
 Cilantro (2010)
 Jack and the Bad Man (2011)
 The Book Sniffers (2011)
 A Quiet Night, a Perfect End (2012)
 The Call of the House of Usher (2012)
 Hide (2014)
 Pièce de Résistance (2015)
 Zanders the Magnificent (2015)
 Honey (2015)
 The Cottage of Curiosities (2016)
 Vestige (2016)
 The Devil Take the Hindmost (2016)
 Death's Favorite Pet (2017)
 The Lighthouse (2017)
 So Sings the Siren (2017)
 That Which Never Comes (2017)
 Dealing in Shadows (2018)
 Glove Box (2018)
 What Throat (2019)
 She Sleeps (2019)

Poems
 The Secret in the Village of Dragonsbreath (2011)
 The Centipede (2011)
 I am running (2015)
 Fiend (2015)
 Maxwell's Demon (2016)
 Naked (2016)
 The Shed (2016)
 Unravel (2017)
 Light and Liquor (2018)
 To Write (2019)

References and sources

21st-century American women writers
Year of birth missing (living people)
University of Texas alumni
Living people